David Henry Cushing FRS (1920-2008)  was an English born fisheries biologist, who is credited with the development the match/mismatch hypothesis as an explanation for reduced fish stocks as associated with climatic variability.  David Cushing was the first to demonstrate what we now know as "recruitment overfishing" through his work on the collapse of the North Sea herring.

Early life
Cushing was born in Alnwick, England.  His father was an English teacher and his mother was a nurse.  By way of his own desire to be a naturalist, his father's desire for him to become a diplomat, and his mother's desire for him to become a doctor, Cushing found a great interest in fisheries biology and management.  Cushing also served in the British military in the Royal Artillery (1940–1945) and the Royal Fusiliers (1945–1946).  Cushing is survived by his wife, Diana Antona-Traversi, whom he married in 1943, and his daughter.

Career
Cushing received his lower education from Duke's School (Alnwick) and the Royal Grammar School (Newcastle upon Tyne) and received his PhD in 1950 from Balliol College at Oxford University.  His PhD dissertation focused on the vertical migration of zooplankton.

After receiving his PhD, Cushing worked primarily for government organisations that oversaw the fisheries in Great Britain.  For most of his career (1946–1980), he worked for the Centre for Environment, Fisheries, and Aquaculture Science (CEFAS).  At CEFAS, he held the positions of scientific officer, deputy director, and as the head of fish population dynamics.  His last position allowed him to focus primarily on factors influencing the stock dynamics of local fisheries and the management strategies those fisheries open.

Cushing, although not directly employed by, worked closely with the International Council for the Exploration of the Sea (ICES).  At ICES, Cushing held positions on advisory committees for fisheries management and marine pollution.  He also chaired the biological committee and was the head of the herring workgroup.

The most prestigious position that Cushing held was that of the founding editor of the Journal of Plankton Research, which he held from 1979–2001.

Contributions to fish population ecology

Acoustic fish detection
Acoustics were greatly improved upon during World War II so as to be used as a tool to detect unfriendly vessels and underwater hazards.  After the war, acoustic detection was seen as a tool that could assist fisheries biologists to sample stock sizes.  Cushing investigated the mechanisms that permitted the acoustic returns from the signalling devices to the fish and back.  Through experimental procedures, using materials such as meat-filled condoms and air-filled balloons, Cushing determined that greater than 50% of the acoustic return was from the swimbladder of the fish.  Cushing and colleagues also determined that it was possible to resolve, on the species level, the identity of a mass of fish through precise acoustic signals.

Match/mismatch hypothesis
The match/mismatch hypothesis was coined by Cushing as a result of noticeable variations in fish stock recruitment.  The hypothesis focused on the timing, as a function of climate, of the blooms of primary producers (i.e. phytoplankton). Blooms of phytoplankton directly influence the increased population sizes of zooplankton, as the phytoplankton are the primary food source for zooplankton.  Most pelagic fish, in their larval stages, feed directly upon the phytoplankton and zooplankton.  So as logic follows, large populations of phytoplankton will support large populations of zooplankton, and the presence of both will sustain larval fishes.  As Cushing noticed, however, there are climatic influences where temperature anomalies will inhibit phytoplankton blooms, or impact the range of the bloom.  When such events occur, they will have cascading effects that will influence the ability for larval fish to develop, thus reducing the number of fish that recruit into an existing population. With the previously mentioned events, the "match" portion of the hypothesis occurs when plankton blooms occur just prior the hatching of the fish larvae.  In a "match" situation, the fish larvae are able to feed on large quantities of plankton, thus increasing their potential for successful recruitment.  The "mismatch" portion of the hypothesis occurs when plankton blooms occur either earlier than usual, later than usual, or simply in far lesser quantities than expected.  As a result, there are less prey for the fish larvae to feed upon, and the success of a recruitment event is severely diminished.

The match/mismatch hypothesis is featured in many of Cushing's writings, however the most influential purpose of the hypothesis is that of awareness of climate change and fisheries management.  The intent of the hypothesis was to explain climate induced temperature anomalies (as a result of climate change) on fish stocks and the proper management strategies that could be associated with such changes.  With some level of predictability, then, fish stocks would then avoid over-exploitation and be harvested at sustainable levels.

Publications
 Marine Ecology and Fisheries (Cambridge University Press, 1970)
 Plankton production and year-class strength in fish populations: an update of the match/mismatch hypothesis (1990) in Advances in Marine Biology
 Climate and Fisheries (Academic Press New York, 1982)
 

 The Provident Sea (Cambridge University Press, 1988)
 Population Production and Regulation in the Sea: a Fisheries Perspective (Cambridge University Press, 1995)

References

1920 births
2008 deaths
People from Alnwick
20th-century British zoologists
Fisheries scientists
Fellows of the Royal Society